In vexillology, defacement is the addition of a symbol or charge to a flag. For example, the New Zealand flag is the British Blue Ensign defaced with a Southern Cross in the fly.

In the context of vexillology, the word "deface" carries no negative connotations, in contrast to general usage. It simply indicates a differentiation of the flag from that of another owner by addition of elements. For example, many state flags are formed by defacing the national flag with a coat of arms.

History
Where countries pass through changes of regime with contrasting ideological orientations (monarchist/republican, fascist/democratic, communist/capitalist, secular/religious etc.) – all of which, despite their differences, claim allegiance to a common national heritage expressed in a venerated national flag – it can happen that a new regime defaces that flag with its own specific emblem while keeping the basic flag design unchanged. Such changing ideological emblems appeared over time, among others, on the flags of Italy, Hungary, Romania, Germany (West and East; see illustration), Ethiopia, and Iran. As a result, during the Hungarian Revolution of 1956 and the Romanian Revolution of 1989, insurgents tore the emblem of the regime that they opposed out of the national flag and waved the flag with which they identified.  

An already defaced flag can be further defaced. For example, the Australian flag is a defaced British Blue Ensign. The Australian Border Force Flag is further defaced with the words "Australian border force" in block letters.

In the United States, it is against the Flag Code to deface the national flag with advertising or with any other sigil, image, or insignia. Such flags are nevertheless commercially available, depicting the seals of various branches of the U.S. military, Native American-related objects such as tomahawks or war bonnets, and the like.

It is common for association football supporters travelling abroad for a match to bring a national flag defaced with the name of their hometown or a similar local identifier.

Gallery

References 

Heraldry
Flags by design